John Gunnar Håkan Serner (1 September 1933 in Malmö – 25 October 1984 in Stockholm) was a Swedish actor.

Family
He was nephew to Frank Heller, and stepfather to Malin Gjörup.

Awards
In 1977 Serner received the award for Best Actor at the 13th Guldbagge Awards for his roles in the films The Man on the Roof (1976) and Bang! (1977).

Death
Serner committed suicide by hanging himself on 25 October 1984, aged 51.

Partial filmography

1953: Marianne - Marianne's Class Mate
1953: Speed Fever - Gunnar Norén
1955: Violence - Officer (uncredited)
1958: The Goat in the Garden - Smörgåsnissen på Horn (1958) (uncredited)
1958: The Great Amateur - Actor (uncredited)
1958: Playing on the Rainbow - The chairman of the film studio (uncredited)
1958: The Jazz Boy - Telegrambudet
1959: Raggare! - Sven-Erik
1959: Fridolfs farliga ålder
1964: Dear John - Erwin
1965: Calle P. - Criminal
1966: The People of Hemsö (TV Mini-Series) - Norman
1967: Hugs and Kisses - John
1968: Bombi Bitt och jag (TV Series) - Lantmannen
1968: Het snö - Klas Bergström
1969: Som natt och dag - Gustav
1969: Mej och dej - Policeman
1969: Ni ljuger - An inmate (uncredited)
1969: Kameleonterna - Bertil Broström
1970: Pippin on the South Seas - Franko
1970: Ministern - Schering
1971: Niklas och Figuren - Niklas' Father
1971: The Apple War - Eberhard Lindberg
1971: Smoke - Foreman
1973: Den vita stenen (TV Mini-Series) - Skomakaren Sivert Kolmodin
1974: Dunderklumpen! - Lionel (voice)
1975: Ungkarlshotellet - Blomman
1976: Hello Baby - The Girl's Ex-man
1976: The Man on the Roof - Einar Rönn
1977: Bang! - Hinder
1979: Trolltider (TV Series, Julkalendern) - Vätten
1980: Flygnivå 450 - Andre
1981: Snacka går ju... - Acke
1981: Rasmus på luffen - Liander
1984: Sömnen - The Father
1984: The Man from Majorca - Inspector Andersson

References

External links

1984 suicides
1933 births
Actors from Malmö
Best Actor Guldbagge Award winners
20th-century Swedish male actors
Suicides by hanging in Sweden